Morley A. Rosenberg  is a Canadian lawyer and politician. He served as Mayor of Kitchener, Ontario from 1977 to 1982. Prior to that he served on Kitchener City Council as a city councillor for 9 years, from 1968 to 1976, when he was also Chair of the Planning Committee for the City of Kitchener for that period. From 1973 - 1982 he also served as a Council Member of the Region of Waterloo. In 1983 he was appointed to the Ontario Municipal Board and served as a member for twenty years until 2002. Recently he was also a member of the Committee of Adjustment of the City of Toronto (North York) from 2011 to 2015.

He is an alumnus of the University of Western Ontario, graduating in 1960 and well as Osgoode Hall, graduating in 1963 and was called to the bar in 1965. He remained undefeated during his 15 years on Kitchener City Council. He was very involved in historic preservation and environmental issues as a sitting member of the Grand River Conservation Authority and was one of the founders of the K-W Bilingual School.

References

Anglophone Quebec people
Lawyers in Ontario
Living people
Mayors of Kitchener, Ontario
Ontario New Democratic Party candidates in Ontario provincial elections
Politicians from Montreal
Jewish mayors of places in Canada
1937 births